Aydemir Güler (born 1961) is a Turkish communist politician and was the leader of Communist Party of Turkey (TKP).

Biography
Güler was born in 1961 in Istanbul, Turkey. He graduated from St. Joseph High School and Department of Economics, Boğaziçi University. He worked as an assistant in Faculty of Economics, Istanbul University. He received a M.Sc. degree here.

Political career
He became a founder member of Party for Socialist Turkey in 1992. After the party was banned, he was elected as the new chairman of Party for Socialist Power, founded in 1993. In 2001, Party for Socialist Power changed its name to Communist Party of Turkey (Türkiye Komünist Partisi, TKP) and Güler was elected as the chairman of TKP. In the 9th Congress, he quit this post in accordance with the congress decisions for rejuvenation and a political leap forward. 29-year-old Central Committee member Erkan Baş replaced him.

As a member of the Political Bureau of TKP, Güler still contributes left-aligned journals, mainly related with TKP, with his articles.

References

 Milliyet Newspaper Online - Aydemir Güler

External links
 TKP official website

Leaders of political parties in Turkey
Living people
Communist Party of Turkey (current) politicians
Turkish communists
1961 births
St. Joseph High School Istanbul alumni